Costaclis hyalina is a species of sea snail, a marine gastropod mollusk in the family Eulimidae.

Description 
The maximum recorded shell length is 10.7 mm.

Habitat 
Minimum recorded depth is 2 m. Maximum recorded depth is 848 m.

References

 Bouchet P. & Warén A. (1986). Revision of the Northeast Atlantic bathyal and abyssal Aclididae, Eulimidae, Epitonidae (Mollusca, Gastropoda). Bollettino Malacologico Suppl. 2: 297-576

External links

Eulimidae
Gastropods described in 1881